Percutaneous coronary intervention (PCI) is a non-surgical procedure used to treat narrowing of the coronary arteries of the heart found in coronary artery disease. The process involves combining coronary angioplasty with stenting, which is the insertion of a permanent wire-meshed tube that is either drug eluting (DES) or composed of bare metal (BMS). The stent delivery balloon from the angioplasty catheter is inflated with media to force contact between the struts of the stent and the vessel wall (stent apposition), thus widening the blood vessel diameter. After accessing the blood stream through the femoral or radial artery, the procedure uses coronary catheterization to visualise the blood vessels on X-ray imaging. After this, an interventional cardiologist can perform  a coronary angioplasty, using a balloon catheter in which a deflated balloon is advanced into the obstructed artery and inflated to relieve the narrowing; certain devices such as stents can be deployed to keep the blood vessel open. Various other procedures can also be performed.

Primary PCI is the urgent use of PCI in people with acute heart attack, especially where there is evidence of heart damage on the electrocardiogram. PCI is also used in people after other forms of myocardial infarction or unstable angina where there is a high risk of further events. Finally, PCI may be used in people with stable angina pectoris, particularly if the symptoms are difficult to control with medication. PCI is an alternative to coronary artery bypass grafting (CABG, often referred to as "bypass surgery"), which bypasses stenotic arteries by grafting vessels from elsewhere in the body. Under certain circumstances such as extensive blockages, background of diabetes, CABG may be superior.

Coronary angioplasty was first introduced in 1977 by Andreas Gruentzig in Switzerland.

Medical uses

PCI is used primarily to open a blocked coronary artery and restore arterial blood flow to heart tissue, without requiring open-heart surgery. In patients with a restricted or blocked coronary artery, PCI may be the best option to re-establish blood flow as well as prevent angina (chest pain), myocardial infarctions (heart attacks) and death. Today, PCI usually includes the insertion of stents, such as bare-metal stents, drug-eluting stents, and fully resorbable vascular scaffolds (or naturally dissolving stents). The use of stents has been shown to be important during the first three months after PCI; after that, the artery can remain open on its own. This is the premise for developing bioresorbable stents that naturally dissolve after they are no longer needed.

The appropriateness of PCI use depends on many factors. PCI may be appropriate for patients with stable coronary artery disease if they meet certain criteria, such as having any coronary stenosis greater than 50 percent or having angina symptoms that are unresponsive to medical therapy. Although PCI may not provide any greater help in preventing death or myocardial infarction over oral medication for patients with stable coronary artery disease, it likely provides better relief of angina.

In patients with acute coronary syndromes, PCI may be appropriate; guidelines and best practices are constantly evolving. In patients with severe blockages, such as ST-segment elevation myocardial infarction (STEMI), PCI can be critical to survival as it reduces deaths, myocardial infarctions and angina compared with medication. For patients with either non-ST-segment elevation myocardial infarction (nSTEMI) or unstable angina, treatment with medication and/or PCI depends on a patient's risk assessment. The door-to-balloon time is used as a quality measure for hospitals to determine the timeliness of primary PCI.

The use of PCI in addition to anti-angina medication in stable angina  may reduce the number of patients with angina attacks for up to 3 years following the therapy, but does not reduce the risk of death, future myocardial infarction or need for other interventions.

Adverse events
Coronary angioplasty is widely practiced and has a number of risks; however, major procedural complications are uncommon. Coronary angioplasty is usually performed using invasive catheter-based procedures by an interventional cardiologist, a medical doctor with special training in the treatment of the heart.

The patient is usually awake during angioplasty, and chest discomfort may be experienced during the procedure. The patient remains awake in order to monitor the patient's symptoms. If symptoms indicate the procedure is causing ischemia the cardiologist may alter or abort part of the procedure. Bleeding from the insertion point in the groin (femoral artery) or wrist (radial artery) is common, in part due to the use of antiplatelet drugs. Some bruising is therefore to be expected, but occasionally a hematoma may form. This may delay hospital discharge as flow from the artery into the hematoma may continue (pseudoaneurysm) which requires surgical repair. Infection at the skin puncture site is rare and dissection (tearing) of the access blood vessel is uncommon. Allergic reaction to the contrast dye used is possible, but has been reduced with the newer agents. Deterioration of kidney function can occur in patients with pre-existing kidney disease, but kidney failure requiring dialysis is rare. Vascular access complications are less common and less serious when the procedure is performed via the radial artery.

The most serious risks are death, stroke, ventricular fibrillation (non-sustained ventricular tachycardia is common), myocardial infarction (heart attack, MI), and aortic dissection. A heart attack during or shortly after the procedure occurs in 0.3% of cases; this may require emergency coronary artery bypass surgery. Heart muscle injury characterized by elevated levels of CK-MB, troponin I, and troponin T may occur in up to 30% of all PCI procedures. Elevated enzymes have been associated with later clinical outcomes such as higher risk of death, subsequent MI, and need for repeat revascularization procedures. Angioplasty carried out shortly after an MI has a risk of causing a stroke, but this is less than the risk of a stroke following thrombolytic drug therapy.

As with any procedure involving the heart, complications can sometimes, though rarely, cause death. The mortality rate during angioplasty is 1.2%. Sometimes chest pain can occur during angioplasty because the balloon briefly blocks off the blood supply to the heart.
The risk of complications is higher in:
 People aged 65 and older
 People who have kidney disease or diabetes
 Women
 People who have poor pumping function in their hearts
 People who have extensive heart disease and blockages

Procedure
The term balloon angioplasty is commonly used to describe the inflation of a balloon within the coronary artery to crush the plaque into the walls of the artery. While balloon angioplasty is still done as a part of nearly all percutaneous coronary interventions, it is rarely the only procedure performed.

Other procedures done during a percutaneous coronary intervention include:
 Implantation of stents
 Debulking strategies
 Rotational atherectomy
 Orbital atherectomy
 Laser atherectomy
 Brachytherapy (use of radioactive source to inhibit restenosis)
 Coronary intravascular lithotripsy (IVL)

The angioplasty procedure usually consists of most of the following steps and is performed by a team made up of physicians, physician assistants, nurse practitioners, nurses, radiographers, and endovascular specialists; all of whom have extensive and specialized training in these types of procedures.

 The femoral artery in the leg or the radial artery in the arm is punctured with a needle and a small wire is passed into the artery. This procedure is often termed percutaneous access.
 Once access into the artery is gained, a "sheath introducer" is placed over the wire into the artery to allow catheters to be advanced into the artery and to control bleeding.
 Through this sheath, a long, flexible, soft plastic tube called a "guiding catheter" is pushed. The tip of the guiding catheter is placed at the mouth of the coronary artery. The guiding catheter allows for radio-opaque dyes (usually iodine-based) to be injected into the coronary artery, so that the disease state and location can be readily assessed using real time X-ray visualization.
 During the X-ray visualization, the cardiologist estimates the size of the coronary artery and selects the type of balloon catheter and coronary guidewire that will be used during the case. Heparin (a "blood thinner" or medicine used to prevent the formation of clots) is given to maintain blood flow. Bivalirudin when used instead of heparin has a higher rate of myocardial infarction but lower rates of bleeding.
 The coronary guidewire, which is an extremely thin wire with a radio-opaque flexible tip, is inserted through the guiding catheter and into the coronary artery. While visualizing again by real-time X-ray imaging, the cardiologist guides the wire through the coronary artery to the site of the stenosis or blockage. The tip of the wire is then passed across the blockage. The cardiologist controls the movement and direction of the guidewire by gently manipulating the end that sits outside the patient through twisting of the guidewire.
 While the guidewire is in place, it now acts as the pathway to the stenosis. The tip of the angioplasty or balloon catheter is hollow and is then inserted at the back of the guidewire—thus the guidewire is now inside of the angioplasty catheter. The angioplasty catheter is gently pushed forward, until the deflated balloon is inside of the blockage.
 The balloon is then inflated, and it compresses the atheromatous plaque and stretches the artery wall to expand.
 If a stent was on the balloon, then it will be implanted (left behind) to support the new stretched open position of the artery from the inside.

Types of stent

Traditional bare-metal stents (BMS) provide a mechanical framework that holds the artery wall open, preventing stenosis, or narrowing, of coronary arteries.

Newer drug-eluting stents (DES) are traditional stents with a polymer coating containing drugs that prevent cell proliferation. The antiproliferative drugs are released slowly over time to help prevent tissue growth — which may come in response to the stent — that can block the artery. These types of stents have been shown to help prevent restenosis of the artery through physiological mechanisms that rely upon the suppression of tissue growth at the stent site and local modulation of the body's inflammatory and immune responses. The first two drug-eluting stents to be utilized were the paclitaxel-eluting stent and the sirolimus-eluting stent, both of which have received approval from the U.S. Food and Drug Administration. Most current FDA-approved drug-eluting stents use sirolimus (also known as rapamycin), everolimus and zotarolimus. Biolimus A9-eluting stents, which utilize biodegradable polymers, are approved outside the U.S.

However, in 2006, clinical trials showed a possible connection between drug-eluting stents and an event known as “late stent thrombosis” where the blood clotting inside the stent can occur one or more years after stent implantation. Late stent thrombosis occurs in 0.9% of patients and is fatal in about one-third of cases when the thrombosis occurs. Increased attention to antiplatelet medication duration and new generation stents (such as everolimus-eluting stents) have dramatically reduced concerns about late stent thrombosis.

Newer-generation PCI technologies aim to reduce the risk of late stent thrombosis or other long-term adverse events. Some DES products market a biodegradable polymer coating with the belief that the permanent polymer coatings of DES contribute to long-term inflammation. Other strategies: A more recent study proposes that in the case of population with diabetes mellitus—a population particularly at risk—a treatment with paclitaxel-eluting balloon followed by BMS may reduce the incidence of coronary restenosis or myocardial infarction compared with BMS administered alone.

After placement of a stent or scaffold, the patient needs to take two antiplatelet medications (aspirin and one of a few other options) for several months to help prevent blood clots. The length of time a patient needs to be on dual antiplatelet therapy is individualized based risks of ischemic events and bleeding risk.

Thrombus aspiration
In primary PCI, angiography may demonstrate thrombus (blood clots) inside the coronary arteries. Various studies have been performed to determine whether aspirating these clots (thrombus aspiration or manual thrombectomy) is  beneficial. At the moment there is no evidence that routine clot aspiration improves outcomes.

Complex lesions 
Lesions with a high degree of calcium deposition within the vessel wall, especially if the calcium is circumferential, are considered to be hard to dilate in regards to balloon angioplasty. Complex lesions are one of the key predictors of poor outcome in percutaneous coronary intervention (PCI), hence calcium lesion modification is needed before implantations of stents. The aim is to create cracks in the calcium within the vessel wall in order to increase the likelihood of successful expansion of the stenosis and delivery of the final stent. This is traditionally achieved by balloon angioplasty or debulking strategies including rotational, orbital and laser atherectomy. However, coronary intravascular lithotripsy using acoustic shockwaves is a novel approach for treating superficial and deep calcium in the vessel wall.

Usage
Percutaneous coronary angioplasty is one of the most common procedures performed during U.S. hospital stays; it accounted for 3.6% of all operating room procedures performed in 2011. Between 2001 and 2011, however, its volume decreased by 28%, from 773,900 operating procedures performed in 2001 to 560,500 procedures in 2011.

Comparison to CABG
Most studies have found that CABG offers advantages in reducing death and myocardial infarction in people with multivessel blockages compared with PCI. Different modeling studies have come to opposing conclusions on the relative cost-effectiveness of PCI and CABG in people with myocardial ischemia that does not improve with medical treatment.

History

Coronary angioplasty, also known as percutaneous transluminal coronary angioplasty (PTCA), because it is done through the skin and through the lumen of the artery, was first developed in 1977 by Andreas Gruentzig. The first procedure took place Friday Sept 16, 1977, at Zurich, Switzerland. Adoption of the procedure accelerated subsequent to Gruentzig's move to Emory University in the United States. Gruentzig's first fellow at Emory was Merril Knudtson, who, by 1981, had already introduced it to Calgary, Alberta, Canada. By the mid-1980s, many leading medical centers throughout the world were adopting the procedure as a treatment for coronary artery disease.

Angioplasty is sometimes referred to as "Dottering", after Interventional Radiologist, Dr Charles Theodore Dotter, who, together with Dr Melvin P. Judkins, first described angioplasty in 1964. As the range of procedures performed upon coronary artery lumens has widened, the name of the procedure has changed to percutaneous coronary intervention.

Research
Current concepts recognize that after three months the artery has adapted and healed and no longer needs the stent. Complete revasculariztion of all stenosed coronary arteries after a STEMI is more efficacious in terms of major adverse cardiac events and all-cause mortality, while being safer than culprit-vessel-only approach.

Controversy

In 2007 the New England Journal of Medicine published the results of a trial called COURAGE. The study compared stenting as used in PCI to medical therapy alone in symptomatic stable coronary artery disease (CAD). This showed there was no mortality advantage to stenting in stable CAD, though there was earlier relief of symptoms which equalized by five years. After this trial there were widely publicized reports of individual doctors performing PCI in patients who did not meet any traditional criteria. A 2014 meta-analysis showed there may be improved mortality with second generation drug-eluting stents, which were not available during the COURAGE trial. Medical societies have since issued guidelines as to when it is appropriate to perform percutaneous coronary intervention. In response the rate of inappropriate stenting was seen to have declined between 2009 and 2014. Statistics published related to the trends in U.S. hospital procedures, showed a 28% decrease in the overall number of PCIs performed in the period from 2001 to 2011, with the largest decrease notable from 2007.

The 2017 ORBITA study has also caused much controversy, in that it found that following percutaneous coronary intervention there was no statistically significant difference in exercise time compared with medical therapy. The study authors believe that angina relief by PCI is largely a placebo effect. Others have noted the small sample size with insufficient power to detect outcome differences and the short 6 week duration of the trial. 85% of patients in the medical therapy arm elected to have PCI at the end of the trial.

The 2019 ISCHEMIA trial has confirmed that invasive procedures (PCI or CABG) do not reduce death or heart attacks compared to medical therapy alone for stable angina. Patients with angina experienced improved quality of life with PCI compared to medical therapy.

References

External links
 Q&A: Primary angioplasty, 18 Oct 2008
 Percutaneous Coronary Intervention - Patient UK
 Percutaneous Coronary Intervention - Medscape

Cardiac procedures

de:Angioplastie#Koronarangioplastie